The 2014–15 Darmstadt 98 season was the club's 117th season. This was the club's 18th season in the 2. Bundesliga overall and first since promotion.

Background
Darmstadt 98 played in their 117th season in the 2. Bundesliga after having been promoted after a dramatic relegation-promotion playoff against Arminia Bielefeld in which the deciding goal was scored in the 122nd minute. This was widely seen as a sensation, as Darmstadt were supposed to be relegated in the 2012–13 season but were spared due to their rivals having their licence revoked because of going into administration. The promotion finished a 21–year run outside of the 2. Bundesiga.

Competitions

2. Bundesliga

League table

Results summary

Results by round

Matches

DFB-Pokal

References

SV Darmstadt 98 seasons
Darmstadt